The Fox with Nine Tails is a 1994 South Korean film. It was the first feature film by the director Park Heon-su. It was also the film debut of the leading actors Ko So-young and Jung Woo-sung, who later starred together in Beat (1997) and Love (1999).

Plot 
Harah is a kumiho in the guise of a beautiful young woman, who desperately desires to become human. She falls in love with a charming taxi driver, Hyuk, and tries to use him to achieve her goal. But an agent from hell has been sent to track down and destroy her.

Cast 
 Ko So-young ... Harah
 Jung Woo-sung ... Hyuk
 Dokgo Young-jae
 Bang Eun-hee
 Lee Ki-young
 Lee Gun-hee
 Seo Gi-woong
 Kwon Hae-hyo
 Ahn Suk-hwan
 So Il-seop

Production 
The Fox with Nine Tails was the first Korean film to use computer-generated imagery and it foreshadowed other changes in the Korean film industry by pioneering the fantasy genre and using chaebol funds from the Byuksan Group to cover the budget. The opening scenes of the film depicting hell used approximately 200 extras, with the set costing in the region .

Release 
The Fox with Nine Tails was released on 24 July 1994.

References

External links 
 
 

1994 films
South Korean horror films
1990s Korean-language films
South Korean romance films
South Korean fantasy films